Kavak Sports Hall is a multi-purpose indoor sport venue located in Kavak district of Samsun Province, northern Turkey.

The sports hall is situated in Yeni Cami Mah., OSB Sok. 7 in Kavak. The sports hall was built between 2014 and 2015. It hosts basketball, handball and volleyball competitions, as well as archery, karate, and wrestling events. The venue has a seating capacity for 578 spectators.

International events hosted
The venue will host freestyle and Greco-Roman style wrestling events of the 2017 Summer Deaflympics.

References

Sports venues in Samsun
Indoor arenas in Turkey
Basketball venues in Turkey
Handball venues in Turkey
Volleyball venues in Turkey
Archery venues
Wrestling venues
Sports venues completed in 2015
2015 establishments in Turkey
Kavak, Samsun